Rei Toei is a fictional character in the Bridge trilogy of speculative fiction novels by William Gibson. Rei is introduced as the title character in Gibson's 1995 novel Idoru, as an artificial intelligence, an embodied agent simulating a human female idol singer. A personality construct which adapts and learns from her interaction with humans, she irresistibly attracts data analyst protagonist Colin Laney.

Design
The Toei film and music company is a well known studio in Japan, with a well-deserved international reputation. William Gibson imagined that by the time of his Bridge Trilogy, Japanese companies with a determined research direction would be producing products much like Rei Toei, given suitable funding through customer demand.

Rei Toei is a database composite from the wireless broadband internet of Japan, and the world. Her singing voice and performance styles are composites as well, giving her the ability to encompass the viewer's preference as well. In this way, her AI agent form is very similar to user accounts on a group-sharing mainframe.

Implicit in her design is that she is not one Idoru, but many. Individual viewers and fans will have a personalised Rei Toei album, video, and collection of images, as 'she' can be and is customised according to the tastes of viewers.

Projection
By the time Rei Toei has become a commercial entity, commercial in-space animated full-colour holography is also a commercial reality. As noted above, a personalised Rei Toei exist for individual viewers with Net access. However, for public concerts, Rei will take on an appearance that is a group consensus based on the membership of her audience.

Literary analysis 
The character has been described as one of Gibson's "most original, interesting characters".

See also 
 Sharon Apple
 Ananova
 Hatsune Miku
 Eguchi Aimi

Footnotes

External links 
 

Fictional artificial intelligences
William Gibson characters
Fictional anthropomorphic characters
Personifications
Literary characters introduced in 1993
Characters in American novels of the 20th century